A tritonic scale is a  musical scale or mode with three notes per octave. This is in contrast to a heptatonic (seven-note) scale such as the major scale and minor scale, or a dodecatonic (chromatic 12-note) scale, both common in modern Western music. Tritonic scales are not common in modern art music, and are generally associated with indigenous and prehistoric music.

Distribution

India
Early Indian Rig Vedic hymns were tri-tonic, sung in three pitches with no octave: Udatta, Anudatta, and Swarita.

Maori
In a 1969 study, Mervyn McLean noted that tritonic scales were the most common among the Maori tribes he surveyed, comprising 47% of the scales used.

South America
The pre-Hispanic herranza ritual music of the Andes is generally tritonic, based on a major triad, and played on the waqra phuku trumpet, violin, and singer with a tinya drum. The tritonic scale is largely limited to this ritual and to some southern Peruvian Carnival music.

See also
One-third octave
Tritone

References

Musical scales
Tritonic musical scales